Sezgin Ataç (born 21 March 1998) is a Turkish long-distance runner. In 2020, he competed in the men's race at the 2020 World Athletics Half Marathon Championships held in Gdynia, Poland.

In 2019, he competed in the men's event at the 2019 European 10,000m Cup held in London, United Kingdom. In the same year, he finished in 17th place in the men's 10,000 metres event at the 2019 European Athletics U23 Championships held in Gävle, Sweden.

References

External links 
 

Living people
1998 births
Place of birth missing (living people)
Turkish male long-distance runners
Athletes (track and field) at the 2022 Mediterranean Games
Mediterranean Games competitors for Turkey
21st-century Turkish people